The M1, Magistral Route Nr. 1, olimpijka is a main road crossing Belarus. It is a part of European route E30 and is the most important road in the country, connecting Moscow to Poland and Western Europe.

Running from east to west, the road runs from the Russian frontier via Orsha, Barysaw, Minsk, the capital, and Baranavichy to the Polish frontier at Brest. It follows the country's main transit axis, running parallel with the main Warsaw-Minsk-Moscow railway line.

References

Roads in Belarus 
International road networks
Constituent roads of European route E30
European route E85